Augusta can be a given name or surname. It could be derived from Augusta, a title used for the Empresses of the Roman and Byzantine Empires or simply as a feminine variant of August.

Given name

Royalty

 Augusta of Denmark (1580–1639), Duchess of Holstein-Gottorp 
 Princess Augusta of Saxe-Gotha (1719–1772), later Princess of Wales
 Princess Augusta of Great Britain (1737–1813), later Duchess of Brunswick
 Duchess Augusta of Brunswick-Wolfenbüttel (1764–1788)
 Princess Augusta Sophia of the United Kingdom (1768–1840)
 Princess Augusta of Prussia (1780–1841), German salonist and Electress consort of Hesse
 Princess Augusta of Bavaria (1788–1851)
 Princess Augusta of Hesse-Kassel (1797–1889), later Duchess of Cambridge
 Augusta of Saxe-Weimar-Eisenach (1811–1890), German empress
 Princess Augusta of Cambridge (1822–1916), Grand Duchess of Mecklenburg-Strelitz
 Augusta Victoria of Schleswig-Holstein (1858–1921), German empress

Other
 Augusta Anderson (1875–1951), Swedish film actress 
Augusta Fox Bronner (1881–1966), American psychologist
 Augusta Holmès (1847–1903), French composer
 Augusta Jansson (1859–1932), Swedish entrepreneur
 Augusta Jane Evans (1835–1909), American Southern author
 Augusta, Lady Gregory (1852–1932), Irish dramatist and folklorist
 Augusta Leigh (1783–1851), half-sister of George Gordon Byron
 Augusta Löwenhielm (née von Fersen; 1754–1846), Swedish countess and courtier
 Augusta Lundin (1840–1919) fashion designer
Augusta Montaruli (born 1983), Italian politician
 Augusta Schrumpf (1813–1900), Norwegian opera singer
 Augusta Schultz (1871–1925), American tennis player
 Augusta Solberg (1856–1922), Norwegian professional photographer
 Augusta Emma Stetson (1842–1928), American Christian Scientist
 Augusta Stowe-Gullen (1857–1943), was a Canadian medical doctor, lecturer and suffragist
 Augusta Tabor (1833–1895), American mining philanthropist
 Augusta Read Thomas (born 1964), American composer
 St. Augusta of Treviso, 1st century virgin martyr
 Augusta Wallace (disambiguation), multiple people, including:
Augusta Wallace (actress) (fl. 1940s), American actress
Augusta Wallace (judge) (1929–2008), New Zealand jurist
 Augusta Webster (1837–1894), English poet
 Augusta Harvey Worthen (1823–1910), American educator, author

Surname
 Jaroslav Augusta, Czech painter
 Josef Augusta (disambiguation), multiple people, including:
Josef Augusta (ice hockey) (born 1946), Czech ice hockey player and coach
Josef Augusta (paleontologist) (1903–1968), Czechoslovak paleontologist, geologist, and science popularizer
 Pavel Augusta (born 1969), Czech ice hockey player
 Patrik Augusta (born 1969), Czech ice hockey player

Ship name
 Princess Augusta shipwreck

Fictional characters
 "Lady Augusta", a character in Barbara Willard's novel The Richleighs of Tantamount
 Lady Augusta Bracknell, a character in Oscar Wilde's play The Importance of Being Earnest
 Aunt Augusta, a character in Grahame Greene's novel Travels with My Aunt
 Aunt Augusta, a character in P. G. Wodehouse's Jeeves and Wooster novels
 Augusta Longbottom, the grandmother of Neville Longbottom in the Harry Potter books

See also
 August (name)